Legend is a science fiction western television series that ran on UPN from April 18, 1995, until August 22, 1995, with one final re-airing of the pilot on July 3, 1996. It starred Richard Dean Anderson and John de Lancie.

Plot 
Ernest Pratt, a gambling, womanizing, cowardly, hard-drinking writer has created a dashing literary hero, Nicodemus Legend, the main character in a series of wildly imaginative dime novels set in the untamed West. Because Pratt writes the novels in the first person and has posed as Legend for their cover art, many readers believe that Pratt is Nicodemus Legend.

In the pilot episode, when Pratt learns that Nicodemus Legend has been impersonated and a warrant issued for his arrest, he travels to the scene of the incident to clear the name of his protagonist.

Pratt meets up with the impersonator, a great admirer of his tales, the eccentric European scientist Janos Bartoka Nikola Tesla analogue who had been Thomas Edison's research partnerand his brilliant assistant Huitzilopochtli Ramos, who has taken every single course Harvard University had to offer. Bartok "borrowed" the Legend persona in order to help the townspeople of Sheridan, Colorado.

They enlist the reluctant Pratt to their cause, and show him how their scientific expertise and outlandish inventions (frequently based on ideas from Pratt's books) can bolster the impression that Pratt really is Nicodemus Legend. Bartok says:
Your celebrity has the power to give our enemies pause. My science can increase that reputation. And together, we will create the real Legend.

Suffering from writer's block, under pressure from his publishers, and inspired, in spite of himself, at the thought of doing real good, Pratt reluctantly agrees to assume the persona of his literary creation and to live as the image he created of an adventurous and heroic man. Together, they adventure throughout the West solving mysteries, capturing wrong-doers, and making scientific discoveries.

Characters

Main 
 Ernest Pratt, played by Richard Dean Anderson, was born into a good, conservative Boston family in 1836 and attended Harvard College for a short time, where he fell under the spell of the Romantic poets and Gothic literature. Defying his banker father, Pratt decided to pursue the life of a writer and headed west to San Francisco where he became an apprentice reporter for the San Francisco Chronicle. A chance meeting with Mark Twain changed Pratt's life and inspired the young man to set to work on his first successful book, Solitary Knight of the High Plains, which introduced the dashing hero, Nicodemus Legend. Pratt's technique of writing in the first person helps give his readers the impression that Legend's exploits are real.
 Nicodemus Legend, also played by Anderson, is the fictional hero of numerous popular novels by Ernest Pratt. Legend is a champion of the underdog, a crusader for justice and truth. His perfect manners, good looks, courage and dedication, and beautiful hand-beaded buckskin outfits make him a dashing and romantic figure. Legend is tough and quick-witted with an impressive knowledge of science. He hates violence, preferring to use brains instead of a gun.  In sharp contrast with Pratt, Legend does not drink, smoke, or indulge in sexual activity, although frequently approached by attractive women.  Since Pratt's novels are written in the first person from Legend's point of view, many readers fail to realize that Legend is a fictitious character.
 Janos Bartok, played by John de Lancie, was born in Hungary in 1840. He speaks five languages and is a prodigy in mathematics and electrical engineering. Bartok is fascinated with all aspects of life, from the discovery of new scientific advancements to spiritualism and extra-sensory perception and especially with the idea that man will one day fly. After winning a scholarship to the University of Budapest, Bartok came to New York to work at Western Union where he met the young Thomas Edison. A bitter competition developed between these two brilliant scientists. Eventually, Edison destroyed Bartok's reputation by claiming that Bartok had stolen his ideas. Tiring of the scandal and the resulting media attention, Bartok left New York and headed West, settling in Colorado to continue his experiments. His financial backing comes from a wealthy widow in Denver with scientific interests and perhaps other interests in Bartok. In his leisure time he reads the humorous novels of Mark Twain and a series of dime novels which chronicle the adventures of Nicodemus Legend. Janos Bartok was inspired by Serbian scientist Nikola Tesla.

Recurring 
 Huitzilopochtli Ramos, played by Mark Adair Rios, is Mexican, a descendant of Aztec kings who has inherited the great Aztec genius for mathematics. His first name, Huitzilopochtli, means "Hummingbird of the South" and was the name of the chief tribal God in the Aztec religion. Ramos' brilliance was recognized early in his life, and he eventually went to work for a Harvard archaeologist on a dig in Mexico. The archaeologist was so impressed by Ramos' intellect that he helped the young man get a scholarship to Harvard. As a running joke, Ramos was described in several different episodes as having a degree in a wide variety of different specialties. The character was a sharp distinction from the cliche image of the mad scientist's assistant, as Ramos is fiercely intelligent in his own right. Ramos is fiercely devoted to Bartok, whom he met when they were both working for Western Union. Bartok in turn is unstinting in his praise for Ramos.
 Skeeter, played by Jarrad Paul, is Legend’s version of the Artful Dodger who seems to come from nowhere and live nowhere, but who’s always around and into things.
 Harry Parver, played by Bob Balaban, is the representative of Pratt's publisher. He is an Easterner who is fascinated by the West but quite out of place in it. Parver is a businessman surrounded by geniuses, dreamers and lunatics. It is his job to be concerned with deadlines, re-writes and promotional stunts to keep the Legend books at the top of the best-seller lists.

Episodes

Production

Development 
Legend was originally conceived as a TV movie before it was picked up as a series.

Filming 
It was shot on location in Mescal and Tucson, Arizona, from January to June 1995.

Crew 
 Created by: Michael Piller and Bill Dial
 Executive Producers: Bill Dial, Michael Piller
 Executive Producers: Richard Dean Anderson, Michael Greenburg
 Music by: Ken Harrison

Broadcast history 
The series was a Gekko Film Corp production in association with Bill & Mike Productions for Paramount Network Television, broadcast on UPN.

Twelve episodes were aired, including the 2-hour pilot episode.  Despite critical praise, this program aired during UPN's first year of existence and after a change in network management, along with lower than expected ratings, the show was canceled along with almost every other program aired on the UPN lineup.  TV Land aired reruns of all episodes around 1999.

Other media

DVD 
On January 5, 2016, Mill Creek Entertainment released Legend – The Complete Series on DVD in Region 1 for the very first time. However, over ten hours of runtime is spread on just two discs, which means a sub-standard bitrate.

Novels 
While no actual Legend novels were produced, several titles were referenced in the series, in keeping with the plot device of using gimmicks from Pratt's novels.

Reception 
Jeff Jarvis of TV Guide appreciated the show's attempt to follow up The Adventures of Brisco County, Jr., as another western with wry humor, but he ultimately didn't recommend it. Jarvis said that while the show is "cute" and that Anderson and de Lancie "click together", he called the show "dull" when it should be "exciting". David Bianculli of the Daily News received Legend more positively. He liked the two starring actors, and said the western science-fiction format of the show "provides far more fun, and sly intelligence, than viewers might initially suspect." Writing in the New York Post, John Podhoretz called Legend "a gorgeous amalgam of science fiction and old-fashioned Western," noting it was "eerily similar" to The Adventures of Brisco County, Jr. He said the pilot episode was "an engaging piece of work" which was "photographed with stunning care and taste."

References

External links 

Richard Dean Anderson's Legend Page
Legend Episodes on the RDA site
Vidiot's Legend Page

Science fiction Westerns
UPN original programming
1990s Western (genre) television series
Television series by CBS Studios
1990s American science fiction television series
1995 American television series debuts
1995 American television series endings
Steampunk television series
Television shows set in Colorado
1990s American drama television series